Merlin Owen Pasco (1892 – 6 August 1918) was a New Zealand entomologist. Pasco discovered several species of moth previously unknown to science and collected numerous specimens.

Early life and collecting

Pasco was born in Kumara and moved to Queenstown as a child. An amateur entomologist, Pasco created a significant collection of New Zealand lepidoptera in the early 1900s. His collection was particularly notable as it contained specimens collected in and around Queenstown and included type specimens of numerous moth species. Pasco was one of the most productive collectors of type specimens of beetle species described by Thomas Broun. Broun acknowledged the research assistance Pasco gave him and named the beetle species Pterostichus pascoi in Pasco's honour. However this species name was subsequently synonymised by Everard Baldwin Britton and this beetle is now known as Megadromus sandageri.  Pasco was the first entomologist to collect on Tooth Peaks, Wakatipu in Otago.

Species discovered by Pasco
Aponotoreas dissimilis (Philpott, 1914)
Tatosoma fasciata Philpott 1914
Chloroclystis magnimaculata Philpott 1915
Declana sinuosa Philpott 1915
Orocrambus cultus Philpott 1917

WW1 service and death
At the commencement of World War One, Pasco volunteered to serve in the New Zealand Armed Forces but was turned down. He then travelled to Australia and joined the Australian 2nd Division. He served with the Division in Egypt, Gallipoli, and then in France. Pasco was killed in action near the village of Corbie in France on the 6 August 1918. He was 25 years old when he died. Pasco is buried at the La Neuville British Cemetery, Corbie.

Eponyms

Several species were named in honour of Pasco in recognition of his collecting efforts. These species include Scoparia pascoella and Meterana pascoei.

References

1892 births
1918 deaths
New Zealand entomologists
Australian military personnel killed in World War I
People from Kumara, New Zealand
20th-century New Zealand zoologists